Villafranca d'Asti is a comune (municipality) in the Province of Asti in the Italian region Piedmont, located about  southeast of Turin and about  west of Asti.

The town was founded by the commune of Asti in 1275. It is home to the church of Sant'Elena, built in 1646–52 under design of Amedeo di Castellamonte.

The Villafranchian geological age is named for the town.

References

External links
 Official website

Cities and towns in Piedmont